George Ring Cholwell (December 1, 1820 – April 10, 1883) was Warden of the Borough of Norwalk, Connecticut from 1861 to 1863.

He was born in Norwalk, on December 1, 1820, the son of James Cholwell and Anna Maria Ring.

He was clerk of the Board of Underwriters in New York City.

References 

1820 births
1883 deaths
American merchants
Connecticut Democrats
Deaths from typhoid fever
Mayors of Norwalk, Connecticut
19th-century American politicians
19th-century American businesspeople